Fanjeaux is a commune in the Aude department in southern France.

Fanjeaux is located west of Carcassonne. Between 1206 and 1215, Fanjeaux was the home of Saint Dominic, the founder of the Roman Catholic Church's Dominican Order, who preached to the Cathars in the area (see Catharism).

Population

See also
List of medieval bridges in France
Communes of the Aude department
Cahiers de Fanjeaux on the French Wikipedia

References

Communes of Aude
Aude communes articles needing translation from French Wikipedia